The Basseri, Baseri or Basiri is an ethnic group in Iran, it also may refer to:
 Baseri Aqajan, Eqlid County
 Baseri Hadi, Eqlid County
 Baseri, Marvdasht